Quch Tappeh (also Romanized as Qūch Tappeh; also known as Qūsh Tappeh) is a village in Chaharduli Rural District, in the Central District of Asadabad County, Hamadan Province, Iran. At the 2006 census, its population was 411, in 82 families.

References 

Populated places in Asadabad County